Hera Pheri is a comedy show aired in 1999 on Indian pay television channel Star Plus.

Plot
A cunning Ajay Premi (Shekhar Suman) and his wife Rashmi Premi (Rakhi Tandon) are in debt. Ajay received a message from a lawyer, Batterywala (Asrani) that his elder brother Vijay Premi had died in an accident, and they would split his property between him and his younger brother Sanjay Premi (Rohit Roy), who is missing for years. The catch is that Ajay can only inherit if he and Sanjay are present simultaneously to claim their share; otherwise, Sanjay inherits. Then Ajay and Rashmi try every trick in the book to claim their property.

Cast
 Shekhar Suman as Ajay Premi
 Rakhee Tandon as Rashmi Premi
 Rohit Roy as Sanjay Premi
 Bhavana Balsavar as Tina Premi
 Asrani as Batterywala
 Hemant Pandey as Jeevan
 Roshini Achreja as Rekha
 Rajender Mehra as Champak Bhumia

References

Indian television series
StarPlus original programming
1999 Indian television series debuts
Indian comedy television series